Thaila Ayala Sales (born April 14, 1986) is a Brazilian actress and model.

Career 
She began her modeling career at the age of sixteen. In 2006, she enrolled in the Rede Globo Actors Workshop. At the end of the course, she did tests, and got the role of Marcela, the female protagonist of the fourteenth season of the telenovela Malhação.

In 2007, she was photographed by Terry Richardson for the book, Rio, Wonderful Town, which was released later that same year. She was featured in a photo with her breast showing and biting her lip. Casting producer Luis Fernando Silva later claimed to have repented for participation in the book.

In January 2016, Thaila worked with Indian-American Director Aditya J Patwardhan in the upcoming short film When Red is White, aka The Touch of Aurora.

In 2017, she played Vanessa in the 2017 American film Woody Woodpecker, collaborating with Eric Bauza, Timothy Omundson, Graham Verchere.

Personal life 
She married Brazilian actor Paulo Vilhena on November 19, 2011. They split in 2013. In August 2016 Ayala converted to Protestantism and was baptized at the Igreja Pentecostal Anabatista. She is of Italian and Spanish descent.

Filmography

Television

Film

References

External links

 Official website

1986 births
Living people
Actresses from São Paulo (state)
Brazilian telenovela actresses
Brazilian film actresses
Brazilian stage actresses
Brazilian female models
Brazilian Pentecostals
People from Presidente Prudente, São Paulo
Converts to Protestantism
Brazilian expatriates in the United States